Heimir Guðjónsson (born 13 June 1937) is an Icelandic former footballer. He played the position of goalkeeper and played for the Icelandic men's national football team from 1960 to 1965.

See also
List of Iceland international footballers

References

External links

Gudjonsson, Heimir
Gudjonsson, Heimir
Icelandic footballers
Iceland international footballers
Icelandic male footballers
Gudjonsson, Heimir